Osmond Stephenson (born 8 January 1910, date of death unknown) was a Jamaican cricketer. He played in ten first-class matches for the Jamaican cricket team from 1927 to 1939.

See also
 List of Jamaican representative cricketers

References

External links
 

1910 births
Year of death missing
Jamaican cricketers
Jamaica cricketers
Sportspeople from Kingston, Jamaica